Alistair Marriott is an English ballet choreographer and principal character artist of The Royal Ballet.

Biography
Marriott was born in St Margaret's at Cliffe, Kent, England. He began studying dance at the Deal Dance Centre, before entering professional ballet training at the Royal Ballet School. He joined The Royal Ballet in 1988 and danced a varied repertoire before being promoted to Principal Character Artist in 2003. Outside of The Royal Ballet, he has also danced with Adventures in Motion Pictures, in Matthew Bourne's production of Swan Lake.  Marriott is also a choreographer, and has produced works for both The Royal Ballet and Royal Ballet School, including ballets which have been nominated for the National Dance Awards. He has also choreographed a pas de deux for Darcey Bussell, which was performed at the Sadler's Wells Theatre, and also choreographed The Red Shoes for Bussell's theatre tour Viva la Diva.

Selected repertoire
Baron von Rothbart in Swan Lake
Drosselmeyer in The Nutcracker, choreographed by Sir Peter Wright
Dr Coppélius in Coppelia, choreographed by Dame Ninette de Valois
High Brahmin in La Bayadere, choreographed by Rudolph Nureyev 
Kostcheï in The Firebird, choreography by Mikhail Fokine
Step-Sister in Cinderella, choreographed by Sir Frederick Ashton
Widow Simone in La fille mal gardée, choreographed by Sir Frederick Ashton

References

External links

20th-century births
Living people
People educated at the Royal Ballet School
Dancers of The Royal Ballet
English male ballet dancers
21st-century ballet dancers
Year of birth missing (living people)